Kartal is a village in the Nurdağı District, Gaziantep Province, Turkey. The village is inhabited by Turkmens and had a population of 1751 in 2022.

References

Villages in Nurdağı District